John D. deButts (1915–1986) was an American businessman. He served as the chairman and chief executive officer of AT&T from 1972 to 1979.

Biography
After graduating from high school, he enrolled in the Virginia Military Institute in Lexington, where he studied electrical engineering. He received a bachelor's degree in 1936. He served as president of Illinois Bell. From 1972 to 1979, he served as chairman and CEO of AT&T. He objected to the United States federal government's antitrust efforts to break up AT&T. In 1984, he was dismayed by the decision to break up the Bell System's twenty-three operating companies.

In 1976, deButts received the Golden Plate Award of the American Academy of Achievement.

He served as chairman of The Business Council from 1977 to 1978.

He resided in a family farm in Upperville, Virginia. He died of a heart attack in Winchester, Virginia, on December 18, 1986.

References

1915 births
1986 deaths
AT&T people
People from Upperville, Virginia
20th-century American businesspeople